At the 22nd Southeast Asian Games, the athletics events were held at the My Dinh National Stadium in Hanoi, Vietnam from 7 to 12 December 2003. A total of 45 events were contested, of which 23 by male and 22 by female category.

Thailand easily topped the medal table, winning thirteen gold medals and 39 in total, while the host nation Vietnam came in second with eight golds and 31 altogether. The next best performing nations, the Philippines and Malaysia, were almost dead equal as each won eight events and sixteen medals overall. Singapore and Indonesia both won four golds each. Seven of the eleven nations present at the games won medals in athletics.

The quality of the performances in the events was highly variable: some competitions were closely contested at a level expected of the region, while others were far from an international standard – only one medal was awarded in the men's pole vault as only one athlete managed to clear the bar successfully.

Medal summary

Men

Women

Medal table

Results

Men's 5000 metres

References

Results
South East Asian Games. GBR Athletics. Retrieved on 2011-02-11.
Competition Schedule. 2003 SEA Games. Retrieved on 2011-02-11.
Day reports
Vietnam steps onto the international stage – South East Asian Games PREVIEW. IAAF (2003-12-04). Retrieved on 2011-02-11.
Du shines in South East Asian Games - Day One. IAAF (2003-12-07). Retrieved on 2011-02-11.
Loo wins fifth South East Asian Games title – Day Two. IAAF (2003-12-08). Retrieved on 2011-02-11.
Filipino revival set to continue with the Decathlon - South East Asian Games, Day Three. IAAF (2003-12-10). Retrieved on 2011-02-11.
All talk is of Nazmizan and the shock defeat of Khine - South East Asian Games, Day Four. IAAF (2003-12-11). Retrieved on 2011-02-11.
Thais assess their hold on power – South East Asian Games, Final Day. IAAF (2003-12-12). Retrieved on 2011-02-11.

External links
Official website (archived)
Thailand dominate last day on the track from Bangkok Post

Athletics
2003
Southeast Asian Games
2003 SEA Games